Stacey Janelle Cook (born July 3, 1984) is a World Cup alpine ski racer from the United States, and specializes in the speed events.

Racing career
Born in Truckee, California, Cook started skiing at age 4 with her father at various Lake Tahoe ski areas and raced in the learn-to-race Buddy Werner League events run by the Truckee-Donner Recreation and Park District. She has competed in two Olympics and four World Championships. Cook made her first two World Cup podiums in late 2012 in consecutive downhills at Lake Louise,  Canada.

Cook is based in Mammoth Lakes, California.

Career highlights

2005 – NorAm super G runner-up with two wins
2006 – Competed in first Winter Olympics; 19th in downhill and 23rd in giant slalom.
 U.S. super G champion
2007 – competed in first World Championships, 16th in downhill.
2009 – World Championships, 9th in downhill.
2010 – Winter Olympics, 11th in downhill.
2012 – Finished tenth in the World Cup downhill standings; five top-ten finishes in downhill
2013 – Finished Fourth in the World Cup Downhill Standing

World Cup results

Season standings

Standings through 4 February 2018

Podiums
 3 podiums – (3 DH)

World Championship results

Olympic results

Off the slopes
On July 13, 2010, Cook toured the oil-stained areas of Louisiana devastated by the BP Oil Spill as part of a Sierra Club-sponsored event involving 10 current and former athletes,   which included NASCAR racer Leilani Munter, tennis star Chanda Rubin and NFL stars Ovie Mughelli and Mike Alstott

References

External links

 
 Stacey Cook World Cup standings at the International Ski Federation 
 
 
 
 Stacey Cook at the U.S. Ski Team
 Stacey Cook alpine racing at Rossignol
 

1984 births
Living people
American female alpine skiers
Olympic alpine skiers of the United States
Alpine skiers at the 2006 Winter Olympics
Alpine skiers at the 2010 Winter Olympics
Alpine skiers at the 2014 Winter Olympics
Alpine skiers at the 2018 Winter Olympics
Sportspeople from California
People from Truckee, California
People from Mammoth Lakes, California
21st-century American women